Pizhaikkum Vazhi is an Indian Tamil language comedy film released in 1949 with T. S. Durairaj and T. A. Jayalakshmi in the lead roles.

Plot 
The hero (played by T. S. Durairaj) is an idler. He thinks it is easy to earn a living by cheating innocent and unsuspecting people. There is a fake 'swami' (M. R. Swaminathan) and the hero becomes a fake disciple of the 'swami'. He makes cheating the formula of his living. How he does it and what comes to him form the story.

Cast 

 T. S. Durairaj
 T. A. Jayalakshmi
 T. S. Balaiah
 Kali N. Rathnam
 M. R. Swaminathan
 Kulathu Mani
 K. K. Perumal
 P. G. Venkatesan
 C. T. Rajakantham
 P. S. Gnanam
 P. R. Mangalam
 C. K. Nagaratnam
 R. Saraswathi
 Bhagyalakshmi
 N. S. Narayana Pillai
 P. Sundara Rao

Production 
This is the first film produced by the comedian actor T. S. Durairaj.

Soundtrack 
Music was composed by G. Aswathaama and the lyrics were penned by T. K. Sundara Vaathiyar. Singers are T. S. Durairaj, M. R. Swaminathan and Kali N. Rathnam. Playback singers are  D. K. Pattammal and A. P. Komala.

The well-known Carnatic singer D. K. Pattammal rendered three songs in this film:  ‘Enga naatukku entha naadu eedu...', ‘Kottai kattatheydaa...' and ‘Mudalai vaayil...'. T. S. Durairaj also sang a song 'Thuruppu (trumps) illaamey paruppu vegumaa....?' that was well received by the audience.

References 

1948 films
Indian comedy-drama films
1940s Tamil-language films
Indian black-and-white films
1948 comedy-drama films